Furutani is a Japanese surname. Notable people with the surname include:

Dale Furutani (born 1946), American writer
Sokichi Furutani (1914–1985), Japanese serial killer
Warren Furutani (born 1947), American politician

Japanese-language surnames